My Friends may refer to:

 My Friends (film) (Amici miei), an Italian comedy-drama directed by Mario Monicelli
 My Friends (album), an album by The Wailers
 "My Friends" (Red Hot Chili Peppers song)
 "My Friends" (Stereophonics song)
 "My Friends", a song from the musical Sweeney Todd: The Demon Barber of Fleet Street
 "My Friends", a song by Laura Marling, from the album A Creature I Don't Know